John J. Kennedy (ca. 1857 Buffalo, Erie County, New York – February 15, 1914 Buffalo, Erie County, New York) was an American businessman and politician. He was New York State Treasurer from 1911 to 1914.

Early life and career 
He attended the public schools and St. Joseph's College in Buffalo, New York. Then he became a saloon-keeper, first he opened two saloons on the waterfront, later another at the corner of Pearl and Eagle Streets.

He was an alderman of Buffalo from 1885 to 1910, and at times president of the board of aldermen and acting mayor. As a Democrat, he was New York State Treasurer from 1911 to 1914, elected in 1910 and 1912.

Kennedy had been the resident vice president at Buffalo of the United States Fidelity and Guaranty Company of Baltimore, a bonding company connected with Tammany, but upon his election in 1910 had turned over his business to his son William who became Resident Secretary at Buffalo of the company. William Kennedy was linked in the bonding business with Charles F. Murphy, Jr., the nephew of Tammany Hall boss Charles F. Murphy. Both Kennedys, Murphy and others had been investigated by Governor Martin H. Glynn's Special Graft Investigator James W. Osborne and questioned by the Manhattan Grand Jury and District Attorney Charles S. Whitman. According to unnamed sources Treasurer Kennedy feared to be indicted for perjury which was denied by his attorney. On February 15, 1914, he committed suicide.

Personal life and death
In 1881, he married Ottilie Schupp, and they had one daughter, Mary Jane (Jennie) Kennedy, and two sons, James Patrick Kennedy who died as a child and William Henry Kennedy who survived him. On February 15, 1914, reports by local newspapers said that he had committed suicide; however, New York State Treasurer John J. Kennedy was due take the train to New York City to testify against Tammany Hall.  He was found by his son William H. Kennedy in the bathroom at the Markeen Hotel with his throat slashed ear to ear.  Both his wife and son where at the hotel with him. His cousin Thomas H. Kennedy was the police officer on duty at the train station and was called to the hotel at the time of the incident. The New York Times later reported that the treasurer had a train ticket in his pocket and that an audit of his records balanced to the penny. He was buried at the Holy Cross Cemetery on Limestone Hill in Buffalo, New York.

Sources 
 The Political Graveyard: Index to Politicians: Kennedy, J. at politicalgraveyard.com Political Graveyard
  The De. state ticket with short bios, in NYT on October 1, 1910
  Re-nominated, in NYT on October 4, 1912
  Obit in NYT on February 16, 1914
  An outline of the investigation, in NYT on February 16, 1914
  More info on Treasury, and on election of successor, in NYT on February 16, 1914
  His suicide in the middle of the "bonding clique" investigation, in NYT on February 17, 1914
  His fears, and Whitman's investigation, in NYT on February 17, 1914
  His burial, and the bonding business, in NYT on February 18, 1914
  Denials by his lawyer, and his burial, in NYT on February 19, 1914

External links

1850s births
1914 deaths
New York State Treasurers
Politicians from Buffalo, New York
American politicians who committed suicide
Suicides in New York (state)
Date of birth unknown
19th-century American politicians
Businesspeople from Buffalo, New York
19th-century American businesspeople
1914 suicides
Suicides by sharp instrument in the United States